Morgiana may refer to:

 Morgiana (character), a character from One Thousand and One Nights
 Morgiana (film), a 1972 Czechoslovak Gothic horror/drama film